St Johnstone were back in the Scottish Premier League for the first time since 2002 after winning the 2008–09 Scottish First Division. On 15 August 2009, they opened their league season with a 2–1 draw against Motherwell at McDiarmid Park, with Murray Davidson getting the opening league goal after 34 minutes.

In the Scottish Cup, St Johnstone reached the fifth round where they lost by 1–0 to Dundee United.

In the League Cup they went all the way to the semi final where they lost by 2–0 to Rangers at Hampden Park.

Squad

(Vice-Captain)

(Captain)

League table

References

External links
St Johnstone F.C. season 2009–10 at ESPN
 

St Johnstone F.C. seasons
Saint Johnstone